The 1960 UC Santa Barbara Gauchos football team represented University of California, Santa Barbara (UCSB) during the 1960 NCAA College Division football season.

UCSB competed in the California Collegiate Athletic Association (CCAA). The team was led by first-year head coach Bill Hammer, and played home games at La Playa Stadium in Santa Barbara, California. They finished the season with a record of two wins five losses and one tie (2–5–1, 1–3 CCAA). A game that had been scheduled to be played vs. Cal Poly was cancelled due to the plane crash involving the Cal Poly football team.

Schedule

Notes

References

UC Santa Barbara
UC Santa Barbara Gauchos football seasons
UC Santa Barbara Gauchos football